The 2005–06 Israeli Hockey League season was the 15th season of Israel's hockey league. Five teams participated in the league, and the Haifa Hawks won the championship.

Regular season

Playoffs

Semifinals 
 Haifa Hawks - HC Ma'alot 6:2
 HC Bat Yam II - HC Metulla 3:0

Final 
 HC Bat Yam II - Haifa Hawks 0:5

External links 
 Season on hockeyarchives.info

Israeli League
Israeli League (ice hockey) seasons
Seasons